"Bullet Soul" is the fourth single from the American alternative rock band Switchfoot's seventh studio album Hello Hurricane. It was released on November 16, 2010, to modern rock/alternative format radio stations.

In popular culture
The song has had significant airplay during 2009 and 2010 ESPN college football games.
The song was utilized as the theme song for WWE's "TLC: Tables, Ladders & Chairs" pay-per-view in 2009.
The song was featured during a trailer for the 2010 action comedy film Killers.
The song was aired during ESPN's broadcast of the 2011 Fiesta Bowl.

Charts

References

2009 songs
2010 singles
Switchfoot songs
Songs written by Jon Foreman
Songs written by Tim Foreman
Song recordings produced by Mike Elizondo
Atlantic Records singles